Lyman Glacier is located on the north slopes of Mount Adams a stratovolcano in Gifford Pinchot National Forest in the U.S. state of Washington. Below  the glacier splits into three distinct lobes. Lyman Glacier has been in a general state of retreat for over 100 years and lost 34 percent of its surface area between 1904 and 2006.

Lyman Glacier was named after William Denison Lyman by Claude Ewing Rusk because Lyman was one of the first to describe some of Mount Adams' features and history.

See also 
List of glaciers in the United States

References 

Glaciers of Mount Adams (Washington)
Mount Adams (Washington)
Gifford Pinchot National Forest
Glaciers of Yakima County, Washington
Glaciers of Washington (state)